Lautaro Agustín Palacios (born May 29, 1995), nicknamed Tanque (Tank), is an Argentine footballer who currently plays as a striker for Audax Italiano.

Career
Palacios was born in La Plata, Argentina. In 2019, he moved to Chile and joined Chilean Primera B club Unión San Felipe, being loaned to Chilean Primera División club Coquimbo Unido on second half 2020. Along with Coquimbo Unido, he has played at the 2020 Copa Sudamericana, scoring a goal in his debut.

On 2021 season, he was transferred to Audax Italiano on a deal for four years.

On 4 July 2022, Palacios joined Saudi Arabian club Al-Adalah on loan.

References

External links
 
 
 Lautaro Palacios at playmakerstats.com (English version of ceroacero.es)

Living people
1995 births
Footballers from La Plata
Argentine footballers
Torneo Argentino B players
Primera C Metropolitana players
Primera B de Chile players
Chilean Primera División players
Saudi Professional League players
Defensores de Cambaceres footballers
Unión San Felipe footballers
Coquimbo Unido footballers
Audax Italiano footballers
Al-Adalah FC players
Association football forwards
Argentine expatriate footballers
Argentine expatriate sportspeople in Chile
Expatriate footballers in Chile
Argentine expatriate sportspeople in Saudi Arabia
Expatriate footballers in Saudi Arabia